Nathalie Ballet (born 5 May 1967) is a French former professional tennis player.

Ballet started on tour in the late 1980s and On 20 November 1989, she reached her highest WTA singles rankings of 407 and best doubles rankings of 185.

Her only WTA Tour main-draw appearance came at the 1992 Belgian Open where she partnered Agnes Romand in the doubles event. They lost in the First Round to Belgian Laurence Courtois and Belgian Nancy Feber.

ITF finals

Singles (0–1)

Doubles (2–6)

References

External links
 
 

1967 births
Living people
French female tennis players